is an athletics stadium, also used as the support stadium for the Yanmar Stadium Nagai in Nagai Park, Higashisumiyoshi-ku, Osaka, Japan. The Aid Stadium, occasionally called The Second Nagai Stadium allows the bigger stadium to host world class athletic events. It seats 15,000 with overflow room on a grass hill.

It was formerly known as Osaka Nagai Second Stadium. Since March 2014 it has been called Yanmar Field Nagai for the naming rights.

The Aid Stadium is home to Sagawa Express Osaka SC and occasionally Cerezo Osaka from 2006 to 2007.

See also
 Nagai Stadium
 Nagai Ball Gall Field

External links
 World Stadiums entry

Football venues in Japan
Rugby union stadiums in Japan
Sports venues in Osaka
Higashisumiyoshi-ku, Osaka
1993 establishments in Japan
Athletics (track and field) venues in Japan
Sports venues completed in 1993